Kentucky Route 90 (KY 90) is a major east–west state highway in southern Kentucky.

Route description

Barren and Metcalfe Counties
Kentucky Route 90 begins at Cave City at an intersection with KY 70, equipped with a traffic light, in the one part of the city where many restaurants, hotels, and gas stations are located. It is a major tourism hot-spot due to the close proximity to Mammoth Cave National Park, in nearby Edmonson County, along with few other attractions along KY 70 west of the city. In spite of this, both KY 70 and KY 90 markers appear on the signage for Exit 53 of I-65. 

After KY 90's first mile (1.6 km), it intersects U.S. Route 31W, still within city limits of Cave City. KY 90 then heads into a south-southeasterly path to the Barren County seat, Glasgow, where it crosses the Veterans Outer Loop (US 68) passes the local Walmart and a local Marquee Cinema, and then has junctions with US Highways 31E and 68 Business, which is co-joined with Kentucky Route 80 in this area. It also has an intersection with US 31E's business loop at the Barren County courthouse. Before leaving the city of Glasgow, KY 90 has an intersection with the Louie B. Nunn Cumberland Parkway at the exit 14 interchange on the southeastern side of the city.

After leaving Glasgow, the highway continues in a southeasterly fashion and passes through the small town of Eighty Eight, and then goes into southern Metcalfe County, and passes through Summer Shade and Beaumont, intersecting KY 163, which connects Edmonton and Tompkinsville, and descends a hill at the headwaters of Marrowbone Creek (the valley of which it follows for about 10 miles) and passes through Willow Shade and the Marrowbone State Forest and Wildlife Management Area, entering Cumberland County.

Cumberland and Clinton Counties
KY 90 passes through Marrowbone and the county seat, Burkesville, where it has a concurrency with KY 61. The Highway 127 Corridor Sale), which takes place in early August. It cuts through the northern prong of Poplar Mountain, which once had coal mines, and then into Wayne County, where it generally follows a sinkhole plain at the foot of the Pottsville Escarpment, the boundary between the East Kentucky Coal Field and the Eastern Pennyroyal, a limestone karst region.

Wayne County and beyond
The route and its bypass intersect Kentucky Route 92 at Monticello on a northeasterly course, and are known locally as north–south thoroughfares. It passes near Mill Springs, the namesake of a significant early Civil War battle across the Cumberland River (now Lake Cumberland), and a mill built in 1877 (accessible via KY 1275) and maintained by the U.S. Army Corps of Engineers. After entering Pulaski County it becomes a four-lane highway, crosses Lake Cumberland and turns south on a concurrency with US 27 from Burnside, Kentucky. about 14.6 miles (23.5 km) from Burnside to Parkers Lake. Early in this stretch of road is the gateway to General Burnside State Park; it later enters the Daniel Boone National Forest.

After departing US 27 in northern McCreary County, KY 90 is the main route that accesses Cumberland Falls State Resort Park. It crosses the Cumberland River a third time just upstream and around a bend from the falls. At the route's terminus in the Whitley County community of Young's Creek, there is a 0.32 mile-long (0.51 km) spur called KY 90S that serves as a secondary entrance to the highway for traffic going southbound on U.S. 25W. The road is signed as KY 90.

Points of interest and notable events along the route
These are points of interest that can be accessible along this route:
 Mammoth Cave Wildlife Museum at Cave City.
 Crystal Onyx Cave and Campground, on Prewitt's Knob just south of Cave City.
 Roadside park in Marrowbone, on the reputed site of a hospital camp for Union and Confederate soldiers during the Civil War.
 Tyson Foods chicken processing plant in Clinton County, a mile east of the junction with KY 1590.
 Seventy Six Falls (accessible via KY 734 and KY 3062), is a waterfall along the shoreline of Lake Cumberland in northern Clinton County.
 Mill Springs Mill (Wayne County) (accessible via KY 1275).
 General Burnside State Park near Burnside.
Cumberland Falls State Resort Park at the McCreary/Whitley County line. Cumberland Falls faces due north and thus is the site of a "moonbow" produced by the light of the full moon under the right conditions.

Roller Coaster Fair
Kentucky Route 90 from Cave City to just north of Albany, along with Kentucky Route 63 from Glasgow to Tompkinsville, Kentucky, along with US Route 127 in Clinton County, and Tennessee state highways 52, 111, and 51 are designated as the marked route for the annual Roller Coaster Fair, a route-based yard sale event held the first weekend of October. It is named for the "roller coaster" nature of the roads traversing the hills of the Eastern Pennyroyal region.

Additional information about the route 
KY 90 from KY 61 in Burkesville to the US 27 junction at Burnside is part of the Appalachian Development Highway System’s Corridor J.

History

The early days (1929-1960) 
KY 90 was established in 1929 as one of the charter routes of the Kentucky State Highway System. The highway's original western terminus was located in downtown Glasgow at a junction with KY 80 (which at the time was not co-signed with US 68 in this area until the 1940s). The route initially used two Cumberland River ferries, at Burkesville and the Whitley/McCreary County line just south of Cumberland Falls, which were replaced with bridges. KY 90's original eastern terminus was at US 25W in downtown Corbin. Sometime between 1940 and 1955, US 25W was rerouted to the west, to put it closer to Cumberland Falls, and that gave it a concurrency with KY 90's eastern end that was abolished by 1957.

Also in the 1950s, after the route of Interstate 65 had been determined, KY 90 was extended northwest from Glasgow, to a junction with U.S. Route 31W south of Cave City, west of Prewitt's Knob. The road that KY 90 took over, Happy Valley Road, was previously signed as Kentucky Route 351.

The modern days (1960-present) 
Sometime between 1969 and 1972, following the completion of I-65, KY 90 was improved from Glasgow and got a new route directly into Cave City, east of Prewitt's Knob. The western terminus then became a new junction with KY 70 just east of the I-65 exit 53 interchange, thus extending KY 90 by another , and providing westbound KY 90 traffic direct access to I-65.

In 2013, KY 90 between the Cumberland Parkway junction and the Eighty Eight community was reconstructed to add truck-climbing lanes in two spots. Reconstruction of KY 90 continued from that area to the Metcalfe County line, and was completed by Fall 2015. In September and October 2014, the first  of KY 90, along with the KY 70 overpass over I-65 (the latter of which began in 2013), were both reconstructed and were widened to four lanes, plus a center lane for left turns.

Some talks between the KYTC and Stantec are taking place to widen an  stretch of KY 90 from Cave City to Glasgow to either a 2+1 type of road (two lanes plus the turning lane in the center) or a complete 4-laner with a  median. Plans for it are still yet to be placed on the agenda. Opinions of locals are being used for consideration before the project even happens.

Major intersections

Special routes

Glasgow truck route

Kentucky Route 90 Truck is a truck route in Glasgow, Kentucky.

The following is a list of routes that are the component routes of KY 90 Truck:
US 31E from the US 68 Business/KY 90 Junction, and
Louie B. Nunn Cumberland Parkway between exits 11 and 14.

Additionally, US 68 Truck accompanies this truck route in its entirety.

Monticello business route 

Kentucky Route 90 Business is a business route of KY 90 in Monticello, Kentucky. It was the original route of KY 90 until the regular KY 90 was re-routed to the Monticello By-Pass.

Kentucky Route 90 Spur

Kentucky Route 90 Spur (KY 90S) is a spur route of KY 90 in rural northern Whitley County. Although this route is not signed, the route connects KY 90 with U.S. Route 25W just south of KY 90's eastern terminus east of Cumberland Falls.

Former special routes

Glasgow alternate route

In Glasgow, at one time, Alternate KY 90 ran from the US 31E bypass junction with KY 90, continuing as Happy Valley Road, to the intersection with Business Route 31E (North Race Street), and follows the US 31E business route until it reaches the Barren County Courthouse, where KY 90 runs (while being co-signed with US 68 and KY 80, a.k.a. West Main Street). Sometime in the 2000s, that designation was decommissioned. The regular KY 90 became co-signed with US 31E (L. Roger Wells Blvd) from that intersection to the junction with US 68/KY 80, and KY 90 followed US 68 and KY 80 to the Public Square.

References

External links

 
 
 
 
 
 
 
 
KY 90 at Kentucky Roads

 
0090
0090
0090
0090
0090
0090
0090
0090